In enzymology, a benzoate—CoA ligase is an enzyme that catalyzes the chemical reaction

ATP + benzoate + CoA  AMP + diphosphate + benzoyl-CoA

The 3 substrates of this enzyme are ATP, benzoate, and CoA, whereas its 3 products are AMP, diphosphate, and benzoyl-CoA.

This enzyme belongs to the family of ligases, specifically those forming carbon-sulfur bonds as acid-thiol ligases.  The systematic name of this enzyme class is benzoate:CoA ligase (AMP-forming). Other names in common use include benzoate-coenzyme A ligase, benzoyl-coenzyme A synthetase, and benzoyl CoA synthetase (AMP forming).  This enzyme participates in benzoate degradation via coa ligation.

Structural studies

As of late 2007, only one structure has been solved for this class of enzymes, with the PDB accession code .

References

 
 

EC 6.2.1
Enzymes of known structure